Sulphur Springs Cemetery is a historic rural cemetery located at Hounsfield in Jefferson County, New York. It is a cemetery that includes both the original burial ground dating to about 1800 and the much larger "romantic landscape" expansion dating to about 1879. The earliest extant stones date from 1812.

It was listed in the National Register of Historic Places in 1989.

References

Cemeteries on the National Register of Historic Places in New York (state)
1800 establishments in New York (state)
Cemeteries in Jefferson County, New York
National Register of Historic Places in Jefferson County, New York